Zemiropsis pulchrelineata is a species of sea snail, a marine gastropod mollusk, in the family Babyloniidae.

References

pulchrelineata
Gastropods described in 1973